Magallana bilineata, commonly known as the Philippine cupped oyster or slipper oyster, is an economically important species of true oyster found abundantly in the western Pacific Ocean, from the Philippines to Tonga and Fiji. In 2020 an exotic population was discovered in north-east Australia. They are cultured extensively in the Philippines, where annual landings can range from 11,700 to 18,300 tons. They are known as talaba or talabang tsinelas ("slipper oyster") in Filipino to distinguish them from talabang kukong kabayo ("horse-hoof oyster", Saccostrea malabonensis)

See also
Pacific oyster (Magallana gigas)

References

Magallana
Molluscs described in 1913